Paisley was a parliamentary constituency represented in the House of Commons of the Parliament of the United Kingdom from 1832 until 1983, when it was divided into Paisley North and Paisley South. These two constituencies were in turn amalgamated into Paisley and Renfrewshire South and Paisley and Renfrewshire North in 2005.

Boundaries 

The constituency covered the burgh of Paisley.

The boundaries of the constituency, as set out in the Representation of the People (Scotland) Act 1832, were-

"From the Summit of Byres Hill, on the North-east of the Town, in a straight Line to the Point near Knock Hill at which the Renfrew Road is joined by a Road from Glasgow; thence in a straight Line to the Summit of Knock Hill; thence in a straight Line to the Northern Gable of the Moss Toll House on the Greenock Road; thence in a straight Line in the Direction of the Chimney of Linwood Cotton Mill to the Point at which such straight Line cuts the Candren Burn; thence up the Candren Burn to the Point at which the same is joined by the Braidiland Burn at the Bridge over the same on the Johnstone Road; thence up the Braidiland Burn to a Point which is distant Five hundred Yards (measured along the Braidiland Burn) above the said Bridge; thence in a straight Line to Meikleridge Bridge over the Candren Burn; thence in a straight Line to the Point at which the old Neilston Road leaves the new Neilston Road; thence in a straight Line to the Summit of Dykebar Hill; thence in a straight Line to a Point which is One hundred Yards due North-east of the Summit of Bathgo Hill; thence in a straight Line to the Point first described."

Members of Parliament

Election results

Elections in the 1830s

Maxwell resigned, causing a by-election.

 Gordon retired in favour of Sandford

Speirs resigned, causing a by-election.

Elections in the 1840s

Elections in the 1850s

Hastie's death caused a by-election.

Elections in the 1860s

Elections in the 1870s

Elections in the 1880s

Holms' resignation caused a by-election.

Elections in the 1890s

Elections in the 1900s

Elections in the 1910s

General Election 1914–15:
Another General Election was required to take place before the end of 1915. The political parties had been making preparations for an election to take place and by the July 1914, the following candidates had been selected; 
Liberal: John McCallum
Unionist:

Elections in the 1920s

 Cormack was the nominee of the local branch of the Labour party, which did not accept Biggar as the official candidate.

Elections in the 1930s

General Election 1939–40:
Another General Election was required to take place before the end of 1940. The political parties had been making preparations for an election to take place and by the Autumn of 1939, the following candidates had been selected;
Liberal National: Joseph Maclay
Labour: Oliver Baldwin

Election in the 1940s

Elections in the 1950s

Election in the 1960s

Elections in the 1970s

References 

Historic parliamentary constituencies in Scotland (Westminster)
Constituencies of the Parliament of the United Kingdom established in 1832
Constituencies of the Parliament of the United Kingdom disestablished in 1983
Politics of Paisley, Renfrewshire